King Street was once the principal business street in Kilmarnock, East Ayrshire, Scotland. King Street runs from the "Cross" over the Kilmarnock Water and on to the junction with Titchfield Street.

History

King Street was opened up in 1804. 
Many historic buildings in King Street (including the Town House and the King Street Church) were demolished during the redevelopments in the 1970's to 1980's. These buildings were replaced by modern architecture which stand in their place today. The demolition of the eastern side of King Street was criticised in a report commissioned by East Ayrshire Council for the effect it had on the historical and architectural heritage of the area.

References

Transport in East Ayrshire
Kilmarnock